The Torlonia Museum (not identical with the Villa Torlonia on the Via Nomentana) was a museum in Rome, which housed the Torlonia Collection (Collezione Torlonia) of ancient sculptures.

History
The collection of 620 marble and alabaster statues and sarcophagi dating to the Roman Empire period has been described as the "most important private museum of sculpture in the world" by Italian art critic Federico Zeri and, according to The Daily Telegraph, has been "said to rival [the ancient sculptures] of the Vatican." The Encyclopædia Britannica considers the most significant of the works a relief of Heracles freeing Theseus and Peirithoos (4th century BC, attributed to the school of Phidias) and a sculpture of "Hestia Giustiniani" (5th century BC, attributed to Kalamis). Overall, the collection contains 20 statues of Hercules, about 30 of Venus, and 100 of the Caesars and their families, among them a bust of Julius Caesar. Besides, it includes sculptures of the gods from Roman mythology and Roman copies of Greek statues.

According to the newspaper The Daily Telegraph, the namesake of the collection and then the museum, the Roman Torlonia family, received ownership of the collection around 1800 or in the early 19th century. The previous owners, the Giustiniani family, had taken out a loan from the Torlonia dynasty and secured it with the collection, but then defaulted on paying back the loan. (According to earlier information by the same newspaper, however, Prince Giovanni Torlonia himself was the founder of the collection when, in 1810, "he bought some works and unearthed others on his land in Portus".)

Alessandro Torlonia, heir to Giovanni, opened the collection to visitors in their family palace on Via della Lungara, close to the Tiber River, in 1893. In the 1960s, the museum was dismantled and the 77-room palace was illegally converted into a 93-unit apartment building. The collection was put into storage and has not been publicly displayed. In May 2005 the government attempted to buy the collection for 1.2 billion but the offer was declined.

References

External links

 Pietro Ercole Visconti: Catalogo del Museo Torlonia di Sculture Antiche. Roma 1876. 2.Edizione 1881 3.Edizione 1883 (Scanned text - the website archive.org) 
 Carlo Lodovico Visconti: I monumenti del Museo Torlonia riprodotti con la fototipia. Testo, I Roma 1885 (Scanned text - Arachne online database of German Archaeological Institute (DAI) and the Institute of Archaeology of the University of Cologne.) 
 Carlo Lodovico Visconti: I monumenti del Museo Torlonia riprodotti con la fototipia. Tavole, II Roma 1885 (Digitized photographs - Arachne online database of German Archaeological Institute (DAI) and the Institute of Archaeology at the University of Cologne.) 
 Elisabetta Povoledo: "A Storied Collection of Ancient Sculpture Will Finally See the Light", The New York Times, 28 October 2019.

Museums in Rome
Art museums and galleries in Rome
Archaeological museums in Italy
Museums of ancient Rome in Italy
Museums established in 1859
Collections of classical sculpture